Settman is a surname. Notable people with the surname include:

 The Settman family, characters in What Happened to Monday
 Peter Settman (born 1969), Swedish actor, comedian, television presenter, screenwriter, and television producer

See also
 Bettman